The 1955–56 Illinois Fighting Illini men’s basketball team represented the University of Illinois.

Regular season
Harry Combes, for the ninth consecutive year at Illinois, directed a team that would finish no worse than third place in the Big Ten. His 164 wins and 44 losses overall with a 94 and 30 record in the conference gave Combes three "Final Four" finishes as well as three conference championships. Combes' team, recruited by assistant coach Howie Braun, was exclusively recruited from the state of Illinois.

The 1955-56 team had talented lettermen return including the leading scorers George Bon Salle and team "captain" Paul Judson. It also saw the return of Bruce Brothers, Bill Ridley, Bill Altenberger, Hiles Stout, and future Illini head coach, Harv Schmidt. The team also added future NBA all-star Don Ohl as a sophomore. The Illini finished the season with a conference record of 11 wins and 3 losses, finishing in 2nd place in the Big Ten. Unfortunately the Illini would lose four total games with two of the four coming in the final three days of the season.  The Illini's final Associated Press ranking placed them at "#7", however; they maintained a "#2" national ranking for the final month of the regular season. The starting lineup included George Bon Salle at the center position, Bill Ridley and Paul Judson at guard and Harv Schmidt, Bruce Brothers and Don Ohl at the forward slots.

Roster

Source

Schedule
												
Source																
												

|-
!colspan=12 style="background:#DF4E38; color:white;"| Non-Conference regular season

|-
!colspan=9 style="background:#DF4E38; color:#FFFFFF;"|Big Ten regular season

|-					

Bold Italic connotes conference game

Player stats

Awards and honors
Paul Judson
Converse 2nd Team All-American
National Association of Basketball Coaches 3rd Team All-American
United Press International 3rd Team All-American
Newspaper Enterprises Association 3rd Team All-American
International News Service Honorable Mention All-American
Bill Ridley
Converse 2nd Team All-American
National Association of Basketball Coaches 3rd Team All-American
United Press International 3rd Team All-American
Newspaper Enterprises Association 3rd Team All-American
Bruce Brothers
Converse Honorable Mention All-American
Team Most Valuable Player 
Harv Schmidt
Converse Honorable Mention All-American

Team players drafted into the NBA

Rankings

References

Illinois Fighting Illini
Illinois Fighting Illini men's basketball seasons
1955 in sports in Illinois
1956 in sports in Illinois